Turbonilla pusilla is a species of sea snail, a marine gastropod mollusk in the family Pyramidellidae, the pyrams and their allies.

Distribution
This species occurs in the following locations:
 European waters (ERMS scope)
 Greek Exclusive Economic Zone
 Portuguese Exclusive Economic Zone
 Spanish Exclusive Economic Zone
 United Kingdom Exclusive Economic Zone

References

External links
 To Biodiversity Heritage Library (28 publications)
 To CLEMAM

pusilla
Gastropods described in 1844